John Wright is a New Zealand rugby league footballer who represented New Zealand in the 1975 World Cup.

Playing career
In 1973 Wright toured New South Wales with an Auckland under-23 side. He played for the Otahuhu Leopards in the Auckland Rugby League competition.

He was selected for the New Zealand national rugby league team squad for the 1975 World Cup and was part of their 1978 tour of Australia and Papua New Guinea. However, he did not play a test match. He also loves Maynards wine gums and red wine.

References

Living people
New Zealand rugby league players
New Zealand national rugby league team players
Auckland rugby league team players
Rugby league props
Otahuhu Leopards players
Year of birth missing (living people)